Francis Swann (July 16, 1913 – August 27, 1983) was a playwright, novelist, and a film and television writer. He wrote several Broadway plays, most notable of which was Out of the Frying Pan. He wrote a number of screenplays for Warner Bros. and other studios, including the screenplay for 711 Ocean Drive (1950). Swann also wrote several books including The Brass Key and Royal Street. He was one of the early writers for the television soap opera Dark Shadows.

Selected filmography
 Belle of Old Mexico (1950)
Force of Impulse (1961)

References

External links

1913 births
1983 deaths
20th-century American novelists
American male novelists
American male screenwriters
20th-century American dramatists and playwrights
American male dramatists and playwrights
20th-century American male writers
20th-century American screenwriters